"Melancholy" (Nepali: मिलानकोली) is an environmentally-themed song sung by 365 Nepali artists. This song was intended to promote an environmental message by breaking the Guinness World Records for "Most Vocal Solos in a Song Recording", which it successfully did. It was written, music composed and directed by environmentalist Nipesh Dhaka. The song was recorded as a single on 19 May 2016. The recording sessions were inaugurated by Prime Minister Khadga Prasad Oli at 8 am and continued until 6 pm. The song was released on 2 September 2017 by President Bidya Devi Bhandari at Army Officer's Club, Kathmandu.

Background and concept 
Nipesh Dhaka was involved in a variety of environmental research, as well as producing documentaries, including Himalaya Calls (2015), Melancholy (2017), and Rodhan(2017). He visited almost  districts of Nepal, and studied the environmental changes in different geological and ecological regions, and how they affected various communities. He also recorded a song by 206 Nepali artists in different studios of Nepal and Mumbai, including Udit Narayan Jha, Madan Krishna Shrestha, Hari Bansha Acharya, Prem Dhoj Pradhan, Vijaya Lama, Dr. Bhola Rijal, Sambhujeet Baskota and Rajesh Payal Rai. At that time he devised the concept for "Melancholy", with 365 artists collaborating on a single day.

The slogan of the song was "Raise Voice, Save Earth". The event was conducted to break the Guinness World Records of "Most Vocal Solos in a Song Recording" and use this to promote awareness of environmental conservation issues. The song was recorded at Radio Nepal by Prakash Kharel. On 1 February 2018, the song was certified by Guinness World Records.

Documentary

The documentary Melancholy is based on environmental research studies of all geographical regions of Nepal from 2013 to 2018. The documentary explores how human beings are affecting natural resources. It also addresses global environmental problems, such as declining biodiversity, global warming, and climate change, by examining sustainable development from Nepal's point of view. The 80 minute documentary discusses the nature of the ecosystem, and considers equality, equity, dignity, culture, and social impacts of environmental change. It has been shown in many schools, colleges, clubs, mother groups, communities, and societies in Nepal, and has raised funds for 83 Chepang children of Jaldevi Primary School, Rorang Village, Dhading District. It has also been screened at international conferences and film festivals.

Guinness World Record achievement

All 365 singers along with campaign coordinators, organizers, technicians, and volunteers were awarded Guinness World Records certificates for "Most Vocal Solos in a Song Recording", in collaboration with Nepal's Sustainable Environmental and Ecosystem Management (SEEM). This was done at a ceremony on 11 October 2018 at Tribhuvan University International Cricket Ground, in the presence Minister of Culture, Tourism and Civil Aviation Rabindra Adhikari, veteran scholar Satya Mohan Joshi, and senior singer Prem Dhoj Pradhan.

Artists
The soloists in order of group appearance were:
 Madhav Prasad Ghimire (national poet of Nepal)

Group A: Natural resources
 Nipesh DHAKA
 Lochan Bhattarai
 Meera Rana 
 Satya Raj Acharya
 Sworup Raj Acharya
 Sangeeta Rana Pradhan
 Prem Pariyar
 Manoj Raj Siwakoti
 Menuka Poudel
 Chandi Prasad Kafle
 Anand Karki
 Hemant Sharma
 Bhupendra Rayamaji

Group B: Agriculture
 Deepak Jangam
 Kiran Kandel
 Parbisha Adhikari
 Munna Gurung
 Sunita Karki
 Sahima Shrestha
 Satya Kala Rai
 Samjhana Oli
 Jhuma Limbu
 Jonisha Poudel
 Bishwa Nepali
 Sarita Shahi
 Rejina Rimal
 Ajaya Adhikari Sushil
 Bhabin Dhungana
 Anuska Pathak

Group C: Soil and life
 Pradep Basel
 CD Vijaya Adhikari
 Narayan Babu Koirala 
 Bhugol Dahal
 Manisha Rai
 Menuka Rai
 Shantim Koirala
 Keshab Adhikari
 Krishna Bashyal
 Juna Prasai
 Bhimsen Subedi
 Kanchan Thalang
 Parbin Thung Rai
 Ganga Dhar Parajuli
 Yogendra Upadhayaya

Group D: Mine and industries
 Mahesh Khadka
 Mechu Dhimal
 Sudam Thapa
 Sindhu Malla
 B.B. Anuragi
 Prashamsa Shrestha
 Prashna Sakya
 Aarati Thapa
 Manisha Pokharel
 Hari Lamsal
 Mahendra Dahal
 Bidhan Shrestha
 Swechhya Thakuri
 Bhanu Bhakta Dhakal
 Rajan Raj Shiwakoti

Group E: Watershed area
 Anil Poudel
 Anu Dhakal
 Sudesh Subedi
 Bidhata Singh Bhattarai
 Milan Amatya
 Rai Nabin 
 Bimala Bhusal
 Rabindra Rai
 Itu Jojiju
 Rambhakta Jojiju
 Shiva Chaudhary
 Rukman Limbu
 Suresh Lama
 Jaljala Pariyar
 Deepak Limbu
 Bishhnu Chemjong

Group F: Farmer
 Om Bikram Bista
 Sashi Rawal
 Shyam Maharjan
 Radha Rai
 Suren Chand
 Aakanshya Basyal
 Pushpan Pradhan
 Anil Shahi
 Shankar Thapa
 Shreya Sotang
 Sunil Singh Thakuri
 Bishal Atreya
 Kankaist Rai
 Ciney Gurung
 Dharmendra Sewan

Group G: Renewable energy
 Bharat Sitaula
 Sitaram Pokharel
 Kabita Vishwakarma
 Saru Gautam
 Durga Pariyar
 Santosh Shrestha
 Narayan Oli
 Rita K. C.
 Rajeev Lohani
 Apsara Ghimire
 Kobid Bajracharya
 Tika Devi Parsain
 Prahlad Timilsina
 Smita Ghimire

Group H: Diet and quality
 Rekha Shah
 Susan Samsohang
 Hari Gurung
 Parjeet Lama
 Pabitra Ghimire
 Puja Pariyar
 Bijesh Poudel
 Uttam Khadka
 Mausami Gurung
 Binod Koirala
 Suresh Manandhar
 Aashish Diyali
 Suman Gurung

Group I: Health
 Sachin Singh
 Jeevan Kalapremi
 Sanjaya Tumrok
 Kamal Chhetri
 Suraj Thapa
 Hari Shankar Chaudhary
 Sunaj Lamsal
 Dr. Ranjeet  Kumar Jha
 Ajar Jangam
 Puja Gurung
 Sunil Giri
 Sweta Upreti

Group J: Ecosystems
 Shishir Yogi
  Rewat Rai
  Urmila Kutu
  Ram Chandra Kafle
  Junu Rijal Kafle
  Suman Sargam
  Sunita Pradhan Limbu
  Kamala Sapkota
  Binod Baniya
  Tara Laxam Limbu
  Suman Nepali
  Kushal Thalang 
  Prem Raj Poudel
  Basanta Sapkota
  Ritu Kandel

Group K: Forest ecology
  Chetan Sapkota
 Risu Nepali
 Laxmi DeviShrestha
 Kamala Shrestha
 Raj Kumari Thapa
 Kishor Kumar Sharma Sedai
 Prashuram Rijal
 Sanu Tamang
 Milan Moktan
 Ramesh Raj Bhattarai
 Nisha Deshar
 Pramod Chandra Prasain
 Laxmi Risal
 Sanjeev Aale
 Tulasi Parajuli
 Roj Moktan

Group L: Human rights
 Indira Joshi
 Keshav Acharya
 Prekshya Lamsal
 Jams Pradhan
 Deepa Lama
 Ramesh Pathak
 Bimal Parajuli
 Rajesh Kumar Shrestha
 Samyog Yogi
 Narayan Acharya
 Yubraj Chaulagain
 Phul Kumar Bamjan
 Parvati Karki

Group M: Peace
 Hira Maya Waiba
 Devi Rokka
 Deep Tuladhar
 Fulmaya Darji
 Ramesh Sangraula
 Sunny Maharjan
 Mamata Rai
 D. R. Atu
 Romi Basnet

Group N: Education
 Komal Oli
 Rozan Adhikari
 Babul Giri
 Tilak Bam Malla
 Deepak Sharma
 Jhuma Niraula
 Dej Raj Poudyal
 Smriti Shahi
 Sworupa Rasaily
 Rajendra Pokhrel
 Thaneshwor Gautam
 Biju Bajra
 Tika Bhandari
 Desi Pritam Sherpa
 Madan Gopal
 Ashok Poudyal

Group O: National Property
 Bishnu Khatri
 Khadga Garbuja
 Kamali Kanta Bhetuwal
 Sharmila Gurung
 Dharma Gandari
 Krishna Pariyar
 Bharat Nepali
 Jeevan Pariyar
 Bhanu Bhakta Oli
 Purna Kala B.C.
 Ramji Khand
 Nand Krishna Joshi
 Bidhya Timilsina
 Bhumika Shah
 Ganesh Bhandari

Group P: Rural livelihood
  Pashupati Sharma 
 Sagar Birahi
 Bima Kumari Dura
 Jamuna Rana
 Tika Pun
 Sugam Thapa Magar
 Himal Ghale
 Manmohan Thapaliya
 Samjhana Lamichhane Magar
 Dev Raj Ale Magar
 Parbati G.C.
 Madhusudan Thapa
 Khuman Adhikari
 Sunita Dulal
 Radhika Hamal

Group Q: Youth
 Nabin Khadka
 Raju Dhakal
 Smita Dahal
 Sarita Thapa
 Narayan Rayamajhi 
 Devi Gharti Magar
 Asha Thapa
 Laxmi Neupane
 Rosani Rasaili
 Puja Sunuwar

Group R: Natural disaster
 Babu Bogati
 Amrit Bhatta
 Babita Manadhar
 Shristi Sunar
 Bindu Pariyar
 Partap Lama
 Priya Upreti
 Benuka Rai
 Rajay Gurung
 Krishna Reule
 Sushma B.K.
 Jhalak Sangraula
 Raju Singh
 Kala Rai
 Yogeshwar Amatya
 Aakriti Dangal

Group S: Human settlement
 Debash Rai
 Shanti Ram Rai
 Saru Ban
 Paras Mukarung
 Reshma Sunwar
 Uttam Thapa
 Amrit Chhetri
 Simant Santosh
 Banika Pradhan
 Sashi Bikram Thapa
 Shyam Kumar Bishwokarma
 Bhisan Mukarung
 Rhythm Kandel
 Sarada Adhikari
 Mingma Sherpa
 Rakesh Oli

Group T: Society
 Nirnaya Shrestha
 Puskal Sharma
 Ruchi Shrestha
 Ranjan Adhikari
 Rajesh Payal Rai
 Jamuna Sanam
 Indra R.P.
 Sanjana Shrestha
 Binod Rai
 Araj Keshav
 Shambu Baniya
 Arjun Kaushal

Group U: Human resource
  Pramod Kharel 
 Arpana Shrestha
 Kishor Lopchan
 Pushpa Bohora
 Shiva Sangit
 Kamal Kiran
 Durga Prasad Khanal
 Narahari Premi
 Bijaya Biswas Rai
 Pramod Nirwan
 Deepak Baraili
 Malika Karki
 Prakriti Thalang Limbu
 Purusottam Poudel
 Krishna B.K.

Group V: Nationalism
 Gayatri Tripathi
 Prajwal Karki
 Bhim Limbu
 Aagantuk Kharel
 Paras Prakash Nepal
 Suresh Adhikari
 Udesh Shrestha
 Om Prakash Rai
 Sachin Rai
 Subash Chamling
 Nimish Kattel
 Parkash Saput
 Suraj Shahi Thakuri
 Rupak Shrestha
 Pratap Das
 Binay Karki Chhetri

Group W: Ecological cycle
 Nispal Adhikari
 Prisha Shrestha

Group X: Eco-tourism
 Prabhu Raj Dhakal
 Sunil Maskey
 Bimala Rai
 Saru Rai
 Ram Sitaula
 Govinda Madhur Acharya
 Gyanu Rana
 Bihani Bishowkarma
 Balram Raj Banshi
 Bam Bahadur Karki
 Vijaya Lama
 Ananda Rai
 Dhanu Gyangmi Magar
 Jasoda Limbu
 Ankit Babu Adhikari
 Prakash Gurung

Group Y: Climate change
 Himal Sagar
 Yam Baral
 Narayan Subedi
 Madan Century
 Shiva Ale
 Dr. Ishan Gautam
 Hemanta Kanchha Rasaily
 Dr.Bhola Rijal
 Hari Devi Koirala
 Sambhujeet Baskota
 Gurudev Kamat
 Krishna Bhakta Rai

Group Z: The Earth
 Devika Bandana
 Durga Dahal
 Prakash Katuwal
 Shiva Shah
 Jaya Devkota
 Devendra Babu B.K.
 Aashik Prajapati
 Miraj Thapa
 Kumar Rana
 Shuku Ram B.K.
 Rakesh Soni
 Nirmala K.C.
 Bhuwan Prakash Badu
 Desh Bhakta Kunwar
 Deepak Kumar Shahi
 Raju Shah
 Biru Lama
 Bibee Limbu
 Ratna Shrestha
 Nil Mani Bhandari
 Kiran Pudasaini

References

External links
YouTube videos:
"Melancholy" song official trailer
365 participating Nepali artists and groups of "Melancholy"
President Bidya Devi Bhandari released "Melancholy" at Army Officer's Club, Kathamndu, 2 September 2017
What is "Melancholy" Song and its objectives?

Nepalese music
2017 songs